Jarvis Creek is a stream in Rice County, Kansas, in the United States.

According to tradition, Jarvis Creek was named for a man who was robbed and murdered near the creek by his travel companions in 1846.

See also
List of rivers of Kansas

References

Rivers of Rice County, Kansas
Rivers of Kansas